Elizabeth Beecher was an American screenwriter best known for her work on Western-themed movies and television shows in the 1940s and 1950s.

Early life

Beecher was born in Bridgeport, Connecticut, and is a descendant of Harriet Beecher Stowe, author of the book Uncle Tom's Cabin. She graduated from Syracuse University in 1920 with majors in English and history.

Career

Beecher worked as a news reporter and writer for the Syracuse Journal, San Francisco Chronicle, and the New York American. She moved to Hollywood in 1937, where she took up work as a freelance writer. She began writing screenplays for Western film producers as well as television shows such as Lassie and The Gene Autry Show.

Outside of film, Beecher wrote comic and children's books, including adaptions of Twenty Thousand Leagues Under the Sea and Tonka for the Walt Disney Corporation. Additional writings included a cookbook of early American family recipes, seven Little Golden Books, four Big Golden Books, and The Bar-Twenty Cowboy, a book selected for inclusion in the Children's Library at the British Museum. She also rewrote or ghost wrote more than 100 manuscripts.

Filmography

Television

 The Cisco Kid (various)

Movies

 Bullets and Saddles, 1943 (writer)
 Rough Riders of Cheyenne, 1945 (writer)

Personal life

Beecher died on March 3, 1973, in Burbank, California. She was survived by her son, Guy Snowden Miller; her sister, Dorothy Shidler; her grandson, Gene; and her granddaughter, Kerry.

References

External links
 

1898 births
1973 deaths
Syracuse University alumni
Writers from Bridgeport, Connecticut
Screenwriters from Connecticut
Screenwriters from New York (state)
American women screenwriters
20th-century American women writers
20th-century American screenwriters